Cecil is a surname of Welsh origin.

The name was associated with Monmouthshire and derives from the Old Welsh personal name Seisyllt. The name may be related to that of the local Celtic tribe (Silures) and the successor kingdom (Essyllwg).

The spelling has been modified greatly as a result of folk etymological association with the Latin name C(a)ecilius, a derivative of caecus ("blind").

Notable people with the surname
Notable people with the surname include:

 Brett Cecil (born 1986), American baseball pitcher
 Brittanie Cecil (1988–2002), 13-year-old spectator at an ice hockey game killed by a wayward puck
 Chuck Cecil (born 1964), American football player
 David Cecil (courtier) (c. 1460 – 1540), politician and courtier
 Lord David Cecil (1902–1986), British biographer, historian and academic
 Edward Cecil, 1st Viscount Wimbledon (1572–1638), English political and military leader
Edward Cecil (disambiguation)
 Henry Cecil (disambiguation)
 Malcolm Cecil (1937–2021), British jazz bassist and Grammy Award-winning record producer
 Nora Cecil (1878–1951), British-American character actress 
 Rex Cecil (1916–1966), American baseball pitcher 1944–1945
 Richard Cecil (courtier) (ca. 1495 –1553), English nobleman, politician, courtier,
 Robert Cecil (disambiguation)
Robert Gascoyne-Cecil (disambiguation), several people
 William Cecil, 1st Baron Burghley or Lord Burghley (1520–1598), English statesman, the chief advisor of Queen Elizabeth I

See also
 Marquess of Salisbury, which has a family name of Cecil
 Marquess of Exeter, which has a family name of Cecil

Surnames of Welsh origin